John Cassin publishes Illustrations of the Birds of California, Texas, Oregon, British, and Russian America.
Léon Olphe-Galliard takes part in the second congress of Deutsche Ornithologen-Gesellschaft at Gothen in Germany, where he meets Prince Lucien Bonaparte, and other scientists. 
Johan August Wahlberg killed  by a wounded elephant while exploring the headwaters of the Limpopo River.
 Birds described in 1856 include kea,  Brewer's sparrow, western bronze-naped pigeon, yellow-spotted barbet, barred parakeet, 
In October the red-necked nightjar occurred in Britain.
Marc Athanase Parfait Oeillet Des Murs publishes the ornithological section of Voyage autour du monde sur la frégate la Vénus in collaboration with Florent Prévost.
Henry Haversham Godwin-Austen joins the Great Trigonometric Survey of India .
Robert Swinhoe makes an "adventurous" visit to the camphor districts of Formosa
Ongoing events
John Gould The birds of Australia; Supplement 1851–69. 1 vol. 81 plates; Artists: J. Gould and H. C. Richter; Lithographer: H. C. Richter
John Gould The birds of Asia; 1850-83 7 vols. 530 plates, Artists: J. Gould, H. C. Richter, W. Hart and J. Wolf; Lithographers:H. C. Richter and W. Hart

References

Bird
Birding and ornithology by year